Sir Roderick Bignell Weir  (14 July 1927 – 15 November 2021) was a New Zealand businessman.

Early life and family
Weir was born in Palmerston North on 14 July 1927, the son of Clarice Mildred ( Bignell) and Cecil Alexander Weir. His younger sister is the organist Dame Gillian Weir, and his brother (1929–2016) was the bookseller and businessman Graham Ashley Weir.  He received his schooling at Wanganui Boys' College, now known as Whanganui City College.

In 1952, Weir married Loys Agnes Wilson, and the couple had one child. After his wife's death in 1984, Weir married again in 1986, to Anna Jane Peacock, who as Anna MacFarlane contested the Heretaunga electorate for the National Party at the 1984 general election, finishing in second place.

Business career
Weir worked for the New Zealand Loan and Mercantile Agency Company from 1943 to 1963, which in 1961 had become Dalgety & New Zealand Loan Ltd. In 1963, he set up his own stock and station agency branded as Rod Weir & Co. After merger with other agencies, Crown Corp was formed and eventually, the company purchased the New Zealand interests of Dalgety NZ Ltd. Weir retired from this company as chief executive in 1985. He merged his business with Wrightson NMA in 1986.

Weir has held a number of appointments. He was consultant, appointed by the government, on the NZ Apple and Pear Marketing Board. He was chairman of the ASEAN/NZ Business Council, of Amuri Corporation Ltd, of McKechnie Pacific Ltd, and of Sherwood Mercantile Ltd. He was deputy chairman of Rangitira Ltd. He was director of Sun Alliance Insurance Ltd, of Sun Life Assurance Company Ltd, of NZ Casing Company Ltd, of Bain Clarkson Ltd, of Crown Meats Ltd, and a number of other companies.

Other interests
Weir was a member of The Salvation Army Advisory Board. He was on the council of the Wellington Medical Research Foundation. He was a board member of the Massey University Agricultural Research Foundation. He chaired the Massey University Business and Property Trust. He was a trustee of the New Zealand Institute of Economic Research, of Medic Alert, and of Wanganui Boys' College. He held appointments for committees of the National Party.

Weir was appointed a justice of the peace in 1972. He served as the honorary consul general for Austria from 1976 to 1984.

Weir died in Waikanae on 15 November 2021, aged 94.

Honours
Weir was appointed a Knight Bachelor, for services to farming, commerce and the community, in the 1984 Queen's Birthday Honours. He was conferred with an honorary Doctor of Science degree by Massey University in 1993. In 2008, he was inducted into the New Zealand Business Hall of Fame for "stock and station leadership"; he was the 100th laureate.

References

1927 births
2021 deaths
Businesspeople awarded knighthoods
New Zealand stock and station agents
People from Palmerston North
New Zealand Knights Bachelor
People educated at Whanganui City College
New Zealand chief executives
New Zealand justices of the peace